Zacco is a genus of small ray-finned fishes in the family Cyprinidae. They are found in freshwater habitats in China and northern Vietnam. The generic name Zacco derives from the Japanese Zako  (Coarse fish).

Species 
The following species are currently placed in the genus:
 Zacco acutipinnis (Bleeker, 1871)
 Zacco chengtui Sh. Kimura, 1934
 Zacco platypus (Temminck & Schlegel, 1846) (Pale Chub, Pale bleak, Fresh-water sprat)
 Zacco taliensis (Regan, 1907)

Other species formerly placed here are now in Candidia, Nipponocypris, Opsariichthys and Parazacco.

Footnotes

References
 

Cyprinid fish of Asia
Cyprinidae genera
Taxa named by David Starr Jordan
Taxa named by Barton Warren Evermann